The sixth season of Big Brother Germany lasted for 363 days from 1 March 2005 to 26 February 2006 and is therefore the second longest running Big Brother show worldwide, but was firstly considered to run without an end.

The housemates lived in a village with 3 houses: Rich, Normal and Poor. Firstly the housemates had to work in three working areas, a car repair, a fashion atélier and a farm. Midway throughout this season, the working areas were closed down. At the end of the season, a hotel was established where ordinary people or celebrities could visit, the hotel was run by the winner of Celebrity Big Brother UK 2006, Chantelle Houghton.

Summary
Originally this season wasn't meant to end in at least few years, as long as broadcaster would have successful ratings. On 25 November 2005 was announced by RTL II that this "forever" season would end on 26 February 2006 in big ultimate show of Big Brother Germany.

This season started at season 5 finale on 1 March 2005 at 21:15 local time and lasted for 363 days. Auditions held in December 2004 in biggest cities in Austria, Germany, and Switzerland.

In contradiction to pre-season rumors it wasn't complete settlement with church and forest, which should be simulated in big area. This was a facility with three homes.

The village consisted of three houses. Contestants that lived in particular living environments had society status suitable to living area status. Contestants lived in Rich House ("Bosses"), Middle-class house ("Assistants"), and Survival ("Servants"). Even the accommodation reflects each contestant's social standing in the village. The three houses (3, 7, and 9) have separated entrants from the square. In houses 11 and 13 are held matches, as well as in Arena (name "Matchfield" in Season 5). Residents can earn money in various working environments (Car repair garage, The Farmyard, and Fashion Studio). This was the only BB season to have individual so important in team budget, because each individual had his salary.

Weekly task is given to housemates on Monday by Big Brother. Given goal should be reached until Friday, when it ends. In Friday Big Brother decides what contestants had achieved. Team should manage to reach 100% to receive €1,200. Team consists of one Boss, two Assistances, and two Servants. The distribution of wages is respective Boss. Big Brother set requirement that Boss earns €500, Assistances €250, and Servants €100. But ultimately Boss himself decides the wages. Boss was allowed to award  "Golden Point" to the greatest employee. Two golden points meant promotion to Assistant for Servant and €500 cash to his account for Assistant. If one team does not reach weekly target (lower than 85%), than Boss losts his position of power and became a Servant, than viewers vote other team member to become The Boss.

Some work areas change purpose during the season. The Fashion Studio was changed into Big Brother Hotel on 26 November 2005. The Car Repair Headquarters are changed into the "Big Brother – Morning Show" studio between 28 November 2005 and 30 December 2006. The morning show was broadcast every morning from 8:55am to 9:55am at RTL II. Car Repair Garage was modified into The Wedding Chapel for housemate Marco and former housemate Bettina and later into the ice rink.

The Village had its internal telephone system for residents from different houses to communicate. The original village was 5,000 sq meters large, and later was new 600 sq meters facility constructed in the village. This modified village had also entertaining areas, such as pub (Big Bar) and fitness centre.

At launch 11 residents (3 Bosses, 4 Assistants, and 4 Servants) entered the village. In following weeks it increased to 15 residents, which count as the original cast.

The nomination process varies through the season. Usually Big Brother pre-determinates group of housemates that cannot be nominated (Gender, Work Teams, Home Teams, etc.).

Each housemate has his or her own BB account. This account allows contestants to increase wages by challenges and matches. Contestant receives all earned cash won during his or her stay at the eviction. If contestant is expelled or voluntarily leaves the village, than he does not receive his or her account.

The grand cash prize jackpot (250,000 Euro) has been given twice this season. The first time to Giuseppe in August 2005 and second time to Michael at the season finale. During season were housemates awarded cash prizes weekly. All prizes were almost €2,000,000.

Housemates

Nominations table
In the event of the tie, the Village Mayor decided who is up for eviction.

Rounds 1-18

Rounds 19 – Finale

Notes

 The teams (Bosses, Assistants, Workers) should decide between themselves who should be up for eviction.
 The person who is nominated is not actually been evicted. They're up for eviction with a new contender. The first pair displays the two housemates nominated and secondly the still nominated housemates with his/her contender.
 All female housemates could be nominated.
 All male housemates could be nominated.
 The housemates are playing for a jackpot which is paid out by the percentage in a public vote. The two housemates with the fewest votes to save are evicted. Anke and Yousef were saved, as they were new housemates.
 All female housemates could be nominated except for Anke who was a new housemate.
 All male housemates could be nominated.
 All female housemates could be nominated except for Nina who was a new housemate.
 All housemates that worked in the Fashion Studio are automatically up for eviction.
 All housemates that worked in the Workshop are automatically up for eviction.
 All housemates that worked in the Farm are automatically up for eviction.
 All housemates could be nominated.
 As Danni and Ginny failed the Secret Garden challenge, the one with the more nominations will face eviction with the housemates who came second in the previous public vote. Therefore, Danni and Alex are nominated.
 As Gina and Thomas failed to get the most nominations in a secret mission, they are up for eviction with Parsifal.
 The housemates are playing for a jackpot which is paid out by the percentage in a public vote. The four housemates with the fewest votes to save are evicted.
 All housemates of the Poor Team could be nominated.
 All housemates of the Rich Team could be nominated.
 All housemates entered on Day 209 could be nominated.
 All female housemates could be nominated.
 All male housemates could be nominated.
 All female housemates could be nominated.
 The housemates are playing for a jackpot which is paid out by the percentage in a public vote. The housemate with the fewest votes to save is evicted. As Larissa is a new housemate, she was immune from eviction.
 All male housemates could be nominated. As Ivan is a new housemate, he was immune from eviction.
 All female housemates could be nominated. As Manuela is a new housemate, she was immune from eviction.
 All housemates could be nominated. Gerry was immune as new housemates and Birgit won immunity in a match.
 All housemates could be nominated. Gerry and Janice were immune as new housemates. Bianca was nominated for giving the worst reason for her nomination.
 All housemates could be nominated.
 All housemates could be nominated.
 The winner of a darting competition should nominate two housemates for eviction. Ivan, the winner, refuses to nominate two persons for eviction. Therefore, Big Brother decided that the female and the male housemates with the lowest score in round 1 of the competition should be up for eviction.
 The housemates were told to evict one member of their own team. What they don't know was that this person would nominate one housemate of their respective team for eviction. Michael and Thomas were chosen to be fake evicted. Then Michael chose Michelle and Thomas himself to be up for eviction.
 The housemates were given the choice to nominate as normal in the diary room or to choose between 2 names at random. This nomination took place face to face. Denis was immune from this eviction as he had won a match.
 The housemates are playing for a jackpot which is paid out by the percentage in a public vote. The housemate with the fewest votes to save is evicted.
 All housemates were automatically nomination and drawn into pairs. The three winners moved to the final part of the voting.

2005 German television seasons
2006 German television seasons
06